Perambalur taluk is a taluk of Perambalur district in Tamil Nadu, India. Its headquarters is the town of Perambalur.

Geography
Perambalur taluk comprises the town of Perambalur proper and a number of neighbouring towns and villages with gram panchayats, some encompassing smaller settlements known as hamlets:

Aranarai
Alambadi
Appapalayam
Arumbavur
Chathiramanai
Chinna Venmani
Elambalur
Indira Nagar
Mahathmaganthi Nagar
MGR Nagar
Nethaji Nagar
Samathuvapuram Nagar
Eraiyur
Esanai
ladapuram
K.Pudur Village
Kadur
Kalanivasal (Kalazhivasal)
Kalarampatti
Kallai
Kalpadi
Kavulapalayam
Keelakkarai
Keelapuliyur
Ķilumathur
Keezhakkanavai
Koneripalayam
Kunnam
Kurumbalur
Senjeri
Labbaikudikadu
Malayalapatty
Melapuliyur
Mettankadu
Mettupalayam
Mettur
Moolakadu
Nakkasalem
pudhu ammapalayam
Namaiyur
Nathakkadu
Navalur
Nochiyam
Padalur
Palaya Sathanur
Palayam
Paravai
Periya Venmani
Ponnagram
Poolambadi
Pudu vettaikudi
Pudunaduvalur
Renganathapuram
Selliyam Palayam
Sengunam
Sirugudal
Sirumathur Kudikadu
Siruvachur
Sokkanatha Puram
Thambiranpatty
Thirupeyar
Thungapuram
Thuraimangalam
V. Kalathur
Valikandapuram
Varagupadi
Vadakkalur
Vadakumathavi
Velur
Vellanru
veppanthattai
vengalam
Veppur
Vilamuthur
Vaithiyanathapuram
Eachampatti
Pudhu Ammapalayam

Demographics
According to the 2011 census, the taluk of Perambalur had a population of 161,993 with 81,313 males and 80,680 females. There were 992 women for every 1,000 men. The taluk had a literacy rate of 73.87%. Child population in the age group below 6 years were 7,704 Males and 7,054 Females.

References 

Taluks of Perambalur district